Girovaris (also Γκράβαρης - Gkravaris) is an island of the Echinades, among the Ionian Islands group of Greece. As of 2011, it had no resident population. Administratively, it is part of the municipal unit Pylaros.

References

Echinades
Islands of the Ionian Islands (region)
Landforms of Cephalonia
Islands of Greece